Coahuayutla de José María Izazaga    is one of the 81 municipalities of Guerrero, in south-western Mexico. The municipal seat lies at Coahuayutla de Guerrero.  The municipality covers an area of 3,511.5 km². The most populated towns are Coahuayutla de Guerrero (1373 inhabitants), Nueva Cuadrilla (574), El Platanillo (458), Barrio de Lozano (El Rosario) (408), Barrio de Guzmán (El Limón) (240), Colmeneros (243) and El Naranjo (220). 

As of 2005, the municipality had a total population of 13,291.

References

Municipalities of Guerrero